Koontz Lake is a census-designated place (CDP) in Marshall and Starke counties, in the U.S. state of Indiana. The population was 1,557 at the 2010 census.

History
Koontz Lake was named for the nearby lake, which in turn was named after local mill owner, Samuel Koontz. The community was devastated by tornadoes as part of the Palm Sunday Tornado Outbreak of 1965.

Geography
Koontz Lake is located at  (41.413804, -86.482628).

Demographics

As of the census of 2000, there were 1,554 people, 652 households, and 449 families residing in the CDP. The racial makeup of the CDP was 97.75% White, 0.13% African American, 0.58% Native American, 0.58% from other races, and 0.97% from two or more races. Hispanic or Latino of any race were 1.74% of the population.

There were 652 households, out of which 26.7% had children under the age of 18 living with them, 56.6% were married couples living together, 8.4% had a female householder with no husband present, and 31.0% were non-families. 26.5% of all households were made up of individuals, and 13.3% had someone living alone who was 65 years of age or older.  The average household size was 2.38 and the average family size was 2.85.

In the CDP, the population was spread out, with 21.6% under the age of 18, 7.7% from 18 to 24, 25.7% from 25 to 44, 27.0% from 45 to 64, and 18.0% who were 65 years of age or older.  The median age was 41 years. For every 100 females, there were 93.8 males.  For every 100 females age 18 and over, there were 94.1 males.

The median income for a household in the CDP was $37,137, and the median income for a family was $45,114. Males had a median income of $35,388 versus $21,563 for females. The per capita income for the CDP was $21,429.  About 6.7% of families and 7.7% of the population were below the poverty line, including 11.5% of those under age 18 and 5.7% of those age 65 or over.

Education
Koontz Lake has a public library, a branch of the Starke County Public Library System.

Notes

External links
 Koontz Lake History by the Starke County Public Library
 Koontz Lake Association
 Koontz Lake Regional Sewer District
 Koontz Lake Volunteer Fire Department

Census-designated places in Marshall County, Indiana
Census-designated places in Starke County, Indiana
Census-designated places in Indiana